Roger Bigod may refer to:

Roger Bigod of Norfolk (died 1107), Norman knight who came to England with William the Conqueror; father of Hugh Bigod, 1st Earl of Norfolk
Roger Bigod, 2nd Earl of Norfolk (c. 1144/1150 – 1221)
Roger Bigod, 4th Earl of Norfolk (c. 1209 – 1270), Marshal of England
Roger Bigod, 5th Earl of Norfolk (1245 – 1306)

Bigod family